Jason Lee Gilchrist (born 17 December 1994) is an English professional footballer who plays as a forward for Ashton United.

Career
Born in St Helens, Merseyside, Gilchrist attended the De La Salle School in the town. He joined Manchester City in 2001 at the age of six, having been picked up by local scout Jimmy Pullen. He spent ten years at the club and was top scorer in six of those seasons. He failed to earn a scholarship with Manchester City and in the summer of 2011 he joined Burnley on a two-year scholarship. In his first season in the youth team he scored 26 goals finishing as top goalscorer. In his second year in the youth team he scored 22 goals, which included a hat-trick at Old Trafford against Manchester United in the FA Youth Cup. In March 2013 he experienced his first taste of senior football joining Conference North side Droylsden on loan until the end of the season. He made his debut for the club in a 3–0 home defeat to Guiseley. His first professional goal came in April 2013 in a 3–1 away win at Colwyn Bay. He made a total of ten appearances for the Bloods scoring once, however, he could not save the club from relegation to the Northern Premier League.

In the summer of 2013 following the conclusion of his scholarship he was offered a one-year professional contract with the Championship side. He spent the majority of his first year as a professional playing in the Development Squad as Burnley gained promotion to the Premier League. In the summer of 2014 he signed a new one-year contract extension, remaining in the Development Squad. In February 2015 he signed for League Two side Accrington Stanley on loan until the end of the season. He made his professional league debut in a 3–0 away defeat to Burton Albion, replacing Josh Windass as a substitute.

In January 2016, he was sent out on loan to National League side Chester on a one-month loan deal. In April 2016, it was announced that he was to leave Burnley at the end of the season after his contract was not renewed and joined FC United of Manchester in time for the start of the 2016–17 season.
In November 2017, Gilchrist joined National League North rivals Southport for a club record fee. He scored 26 Goals for the club and was the top scorer in the National League North for the 2017–18 season. He was transfer listed by the club in March 2019. On 28 March 2019, Gilchrist joined Stockport County on loan until the end of the 2018–2019 season. He signed for South Shields ahead of the 2019/2020 season. On 18 January 2021, Gilchrist joined National League North side York City on a one-month loan deal. In June 2021, Gilchrist joined York on a permanent deal.

In December 2021, Gilchrist signed for Northern Premier League Premier Division side Buxton. The season ended in success as Buxton were crowned champions and promoted to the National League North.

In January 2023, Gilchrist returned to the Northern Premier League to join Ashton United.

Career statistics

References

External links

1994 births
Living people
Footballers from St Helens, Merseyside
English footballers
Association football forwards
Accrington Stanley F.C. players
Burnley F.C. players
Chester F.C. players
Droylsden F.C. players
F.C. United of Manchester players
South Shields F.C. (1974) players
Southport F.C. players
Stockport County F.C. players
York City F.C. players
Buxton F.C. players
Ashton United F.C. players
National League (English football) players
English Football League players
Northern Premier League players